The second season of the superhero comedy drama television series The Umbrella Academy was released on Netflix on July 31, 2020, and consisted of 10 episodes. Developed by Steve Blackman and Jeremy Slater, the series is an adaptation of the comic book series of the same name written by Gerard Way and illustrated by Gabriel Bá, both of whom serve as executive producers on the series. The second season revolves around the Hargreeves siblings being scattered throughout the 60s in Dallas, reuniting to put a stop to the apocalypse, having brought it with them.

The second season features Elliot Page, Tom Hopper, David Castañeda, Emmy Raver-Lampman, Robert Sheehan, Aidan Gallagher, Justin H. Min, Ritu Arya, Yusuf Gatewood, Marin Ireland, Adam Godley, Kate Walsh, and Colm Feore as a part of the main cast, while Kevin Rankin, Jordan Claire Robbins, Justin Paul Kelly, John Kapelos, and Kris Holden-Ried appear in recurring roles. The second season received positive reviews, with it being deemed an improvement over its predecessor.

Cast and characters

Main 
 Elliot Page as Viktor Hargreeves {deadname:Vanya} / The White Violin / Number Seven
T.J. McGibbon as young Viktor
 Tom Hopper as Luther Hargreeves / Spaceboy / Number One
 Cameron Brodeur as young Luther
 David Castañeda as Diego Hargreeves / The Kraken / Number Two
Blake Talabis as young Diego
 Emmy Raver-Lampman as Allison Hargreeves / The Rumor / Number Three
Eden Cupid as young Allison
 Robert Sheehan as Klaus Hargreeves / The Séance / Number Four
Dante Albidone as young Klaus
 Aidan Gallagher as Five Hargreeves / The Boy / Number Five
 Justin H. Min as  Ben Hargreeves / The Horror / Number Six
 Ethan Hwang as young Ben
 Min also portrays an alternate version of Ben (Number Two) that appears as a part of the Sparrow Academy in the final episode.
 Ritu Arya as Lila Pitts
 Yusuf Gatewood as Raymond Chestnut
 Marin Ireland as Sissy Cooper
 Adam Godley as Pogo
 Kate Walsh as The Handler
 Colm Feore as Sir Reginald Hargreeves / The Monocle

Recurring 
 Kevin Rankin as Elliott Gussman
 Jordan Claire Robbins as Grace
 Justin Paul Kelly as Harlan Cooper
 John Kapelos as Jack Ruby
 Kris Holden-Ried as Axel
 Jason Bryden as Otto
 Tom Sinclair as Oscar
 Stephen Bogaert as Carl Cooper
 Ken Hall as Herb
 Dov Tiefenbach as Keechie
 Robin Atkin Downes as A.J. Carmichael
 Mouna Traoré as Jill

Episodes

Production

Development
Following the success of the first season, on April 2, 2019, the series was renewed for a second season, which was released on July 31, 2020. It was also confirmed that the second season will consist of ten episodes, like the previous season. The season release date remained unknown until May 18, 2020, when a teaser trailer concept was released where the main cast danced to "I Think We're Alone Now" by Tiffany. Steve Blackman confirmed to The Hollywood Reporter that he wants to stay in the course of what the comics are doing without deviating too much. On June 26 it was revealed that the series will be taking place at the 60s in Dallas, due to the time travel from the end of the previous season.

Casting
Following the renewal, Elliot Page, Tom Hopper, David Castañeda, Emmy Raver-Lampman, Robert Sheehan, and Aidan Gallagher were all confirmed to be returning to reprise their roles as the Hargreeves siblings. In January 2020, Justin H. Min and Kate Walsh were promoted to series regulars for the second season, following their recurring roles in the first season. On September 10, 2019, Netflix announced that three additional actors — Ritu Arya, Marin Ireland and Yusuf Gatewood — would join the cast. On October 17, 2019, John Kapelos announced that he would be joining the recurring cast as Jack Ruby, the man who killed Lee Harvey Oswald.

Filming
Principal photography for the second season began on June 16, 2019. Like the previous season, it was filmed in Toronto and Hamilton, Ontario, despite the series taking place in Dallas, Texas. Exterior shots were taken in Dallas such as the Dealey Plaza. Filming concluded on November 23, 2019.

Visual effects
The second season used 400 shots from the Folks VFX Montreal team under the guidance of VFX supervisor Laurent Spillemaecker to create time portal effects seen throughout the season, particularly Five's special ability. Meanwhile, Spillemaecker's crew recreated events surrounding JFK's fateful Dallas visit, while including The Umbrella Academy's superpower interactions. Pictures and references from the 60s were provided to create and later to be used as digital matte paintings and CG environments, to transform Canada into the show's setting, 1960s Dallas.

The opening scene of the second season, where the siblings fight the Soviets on a Dallas street, was the most complicated to do, being nearly completely CGI. It was released on a 360 degree bluescreen backlot set which was 15 feet tall and 200 feet by 60 feet. The only real things that weren't made of CGI, were the tank, soldiers, cast and the rubble on the ground. The set was LiDAR scanned so that the director, Sylvian White could walk around using a VR edition of the iPad. They used a Phantom running at 700 frames per second on a camera stick. The scene was also divided in seven parts, beginning with Number Five's arrival at 1963, and concluding before Diego's first lines. For safety reasons the crew couldn't fire the AK-47s at Diego so they were forced to do multiple passes.

Music
The show’s score album, composed by Jeff Russo and Perrine Virgile, was released on November 6, 2020, a little over 3 months after the season’s release.

Reception

Audience viewership
On September 3, 2020 Netflix revealed the show broke numerous records in viewerships, following the second season debut. During the second season first week, the show was the most watched television series show on Netflix, being atop of the Nielsen ratings and thus confirming that 3 billion minutes of the show's two seasons were viewed. On October 21, 2020 Netflix published the Nielsen ratings and revealed that the show's second season was streamed by over 43 million viewers in its first 28 days. It made it the 6th most watched show of that year, behind shows like The Queen's Gambit and Ratched.

Critical response
For the second season, Rotten Tomatoes identified 91% of 89 reviews as positive, with an average rating of 7.9/10. The website's critical consensus states, "Proof that time can heal almost all wounds, The Umbrella Academy exhilarating second season lightens its tonal load without losing its emotional core, giving the super siblings room to grow while doubling down on the time traveling fun." The season garnered a weighted average score of 67 out of 100 from 12 critics on Metacritic, signifying "generally favorable reviews".

Scott Bryan from BBC commented, "The less you think about the plot, the more you enjoy the ride, and the funnier and more interesting it is too." Caroline Siede from The A.V. Club in a positive review wrote, "This season two premiere delivers a stronger, better version of The Umbrella Academy – one that finally starts to pay off the promise of the series." Laura Prudom of IGN praised the series for its action sequences, soundtrack, and the themes about family, and considered it an improvement on the previous season. Tom Long from The Detroit News gave a positive response for its representation of LGBT and race issues. Richard Lawson from The Vanity Fair praised the visual effects, and considered the season to be sleeker and more vivid than the first season. Sabrina Barr from The Independent commented: "Employing dry Wes Anderson-style humour and end-of-the-world exploits worthy of Heroes, the second season of The Umbrella Academy is just as – if not more – wacky than the first." Lacy Baugher of Paste praised the series for not being like any other superhero movie or series, giving a positive response about its family themes, and the siblings' struggles and addictions.

Despite some Jewish writers criticizing the character of The Handler for her use of antisemitic stereotypes in the first season, The Handler was again shown speaking Yiddish in the second season, leading some to complain that the show hadn't done enough to address Jewish viewers' concerns.

Accolades

Notes

References

2020 American television seasons